Palais Königswarter is a Ringstraßenpalais in Vienna, Austria. It was built for the aristocratic Königswarter family.

Konigswarter